The Department of Philosophy is an academic division in the Faculty of Social Sciences at the University of Warwick. It is known for its strengths in Continental philosophy.

Rankings 
The Times places the department 3rd and The Guardian 6th in the UK in their respective 2021 league tables for best UK universities for philosophy.

The Philosophical Gourmet Report lists the department 8th in the UK, and 3rd and 6th in the English speaking world for 19th and 20th century continental philosophy respectively. It also ranks the department 10th in Political Philosophy, 13th in Applied Ethics, 14th in Kant, 15th in Philosophy of Mathematics and Philosophy of Law, and among the 12 "Highly Recommended" PhD programmes in Philosophy of Art.

QS World University Rankings places the department 9th in the UK and 43rd globally in 2021.

Awards
The department has been awarded a Bronze Athena Swan award by the Equality Challenge Unit.

Journal
The Department publishes Pli: The Warwick Journal of Philosophy which is focused upon European philosophical traditions.

Permanent faculty

Emeritus faculty
 Roger Trigg
 Christine Battersby
 David Miller

Former faculty
Andrew Benjamin
Bill Brewer
Nick Land
Sadie Plant
Keith Ansell-Pearson

Notable alumni
Andrew Benjamin
Brian Deer
Keith W. Faulkner
Kit Fine
Steve Goodman
Beth Lord
Michael Andrew Lewis
Pippa Norris
Nina Power
Jeremy Weate
Reza Negarestani
Alberto Toscano
Mark Fisher

References

External links
 Official Website

University of Warwick
Philosophy departments in the United Kingdom